Cordia is a genus in the borage family (Boraginaceae).

, Plants of the World Online accepted the following species:

Cordia aberrans I.M.Johnst.
Cordia acutifolia Fresen.
Cordia affinis Fresen.
Cordia africana Lam.
Cordia allartii Killip
Cordia alliodora (Ruiz & Pav.) Oken
Cordia americana (L.) Gottschling & J.S.Mill.
Cordia anabaptista Cham.
Cordia anisophylla J.S.Mill.
Cordia aristeguietae G.Agostini
Cordia aspera G.Forst.
Cordia aurantiaca Baker
Cordia balanocarpa Brenan
Cordia bantamensis Blume
Cordia bequaertii De Wild.
Cordia bicolor A.DC.
Cordia blanchetii A.DC.
Cordia blancoi S.Vidal
Cordia bogotensis Benth.
Cordia boissieri A.DC.
Cordia bordasii Schinini
Cordia borinquensis Urb.
Cordia brachytricha Fresen.
Cordia brasiliensis (I.M.Johnst.) Gottschling & J.S.Mill.
Cordia brunnea Kurz
Cordia buxifolia Juss. ex Poir.
Cordia cabanayensis Gaviria
Cordia caffra Sond.
Cordia calocoma Miq.
Cordia cardenasiana J.S.Mill.
Cordia chaetodonta Melch.
Cordia chamissoniana G.Don
Cordia cicatricosa L.O.Williams
Cordia clarkei Brace ex Prain
Cordia cochinchinensis Gagnep.
Cordia colimensis I.M.Johnst.
Cordia collococca L.
Cordia colombiana Killip
Cordia copulata Poir.
Cordia cordiformis I.M.Johnst.
Cordia correae J.S.Mill.
Cordia crassifolia Killip
Cordia crenata Delile
Cordia crispiflora A.DC.
Cordia croatii J.S.Mill.
Cordia curbeloi Alain
Cordia cymosa (Donn.Sm.) Standl.
Cordia decandra Hook. & Arn.
Cordia decipiens I.M.Johnst.
Cordia dentata Poir.
Cordia dewevrei De Wild. & T.Durand
Cordia dichotoma G.Forst.
Cordia diffusa K.C.Jacob
Cordia dillenii Spreng.
Cordia diversifolia Pav. ex A.DC.
Cordia dodecandra A.DC.
Cordia dodecandria Sessé & Moc.
Cordia domestica Roth
Cordia domingensis Lam.
Cordia dubiosa Blume
Cordia dumosa Alain
Cordia dwyeri Nowicke
Cordia ecalyculata Vell.
Cordia elaeagnoides A.DC.
Cordia ellenbeckii Gürke ex Vaupel
Cordia elliptica Sw.
Cordia ensifolia Urb.
Cordia eriostigma Pittier
Cordia exaltata Lam.
Cordia fallax I.M.Johnst.
Cordia fanchoniae Feuillet
Cordia faulknerae Verdc.
Cordia fischeri Gürke
Cordia fissistyla Vollesen
Cordia fitchii Urb.
Cordia fragrantissima Kurz
Cordia fuertesii Estrada
Cordia fulva I.M.Johnst.
Cordia furcans I.M.Johnst.
Cordia fusca M.Stapf
Cordia galeottiana A.Rich.
Cordia gardneri I.M.Johnst.
Cordia gentryi J.S.Mill.
Cordia gerascanthus L.
Cordia gilletii De Wild.
Cordia glabrata (Mart.) A.DC.
Cordia glabrifolia M.Stapf
Cordia glazioviana (Taub.) Gottschling & J.S.Mill.
Cordia globifera W.W.Sm.
Cordia globulifera I.M.Johnst.
Cordia goeldiana Huber
Cordia goetzei Gürke
Cordia gracilipes I.M.Johnst.
Cordia grandicalyx Oberm.
Cordia grandis Roxb.
Cordia greggii Torr.
Cordia guacharaca Gaviria
Cordia guerkeana Loes.
Cordia guineensis Thonn.
Cordia harrisii Urb.
Cordia hartwissiana Regel
Cordia hatschbachii J.S.Mill.
Cordia heccaidecandra Loes.
Cordia ignea Urb. & Ekman
Cordia iguaguana Melch. ex I.M.Johnst.
Cordia igualensis Bartlett
Cordia incognita Gottschling & J.S.Mill.
Cordia insignis Cham.
Cordia intermedia Fresen.
Cordia killipiana J.S.Mill.
Cordia kingstoniana J.S.Mill.
Cordia koemariae J.S.Mill.
Cordia laevifrons I.M.Johnst.
Cordia laevigata Lam.
Cordia laevior I.M.Johnst.
Cordia lasiocalyx Pittier
Cordia lasseri G.Agostini ex Gaviria
Cordia latiloba I.M.Johnst.
Cordia leonis (Britton & P.Wilson) Ekman
Cordia leslieae J.S.Mill.
Cordia leucocoma Miq.
Cordia leucosebestena Griseb.
Cordia liesneri J.S.Mill.
Cordia lomatoloba I.M.Johnst.
Cordia longiflora Colla
Cordia longipetiolata Warfa
Cordia lowryana J.S.Mill.
Cordia lucidula I.M.Johnst.
Cordia lutea Lam.
Cordia macleodii (Griff.) Hook.f. & Thomson
Cordia macrantha Chodat
Cordia macrophylla L.
Cordia macvaughii J.S.Mill.
Cordia magnoliifolia Cham.
Cordia mairei Humbert
Cordia mandimbana E.S.Martins
Cordia marioniae Feuillet
Cordia megalantha S.F.Blake
Cordia megiae J.E.Burrows
Cordia membranacea A.DC.
Cordia meridensis Gaviria
Cordia mexiana I.M.Johnst.
Cordia mhaya Kerr
Cordia micayensis Killip
Cordia micronesica Kaneh. & Hatus.
Cordia microsebestena Loes.
Cordia millenii Baker
Cordia moluccana Roxb.
Cordia molundensis Mildbr.
Cordia monoica Roxb.
Cordia morelosana Standl.
Cordia mukuensis Taton
Cordia myxa L.
Cordia naidophila I.M.Johnst.
Cordia nervosa Lam.
Cordia nodosa Lam.
Cordia oblongifolia Thwaites
Cordia obovata Balf.f.
Cordia obtusa Balf.f.
Cordia ochnacea A.DC.
Cordia octandra A.DC.
Cordia oliveri (Britton ex Rusby) Gottschling & J.S.Mill.
Cordia oncocalyx Allemão
Cordia panamensis L.Riley
Cordia panicularis Rudge
Cordia parvifolia A.DC.
Cordia perbella Mildbr.
Cordia perrottetii A.DC.
Cordia peteri Verdc.
Cordia pilosa M.Stapf & Taroda
Cordia pilosissima Baker
Cordia platythyrsa Baker
Cordia porcata Nowicke
Cordia propinqua Merr.
Cordia protracta I.M.Johnst.
Cordia prunifolia I.M.Johnst.
Cordia pulverulenta (Urb.) Alain
Cordia quercifolia Klotzsch
Cordia ramanujamii N.Balach. & Rajendiran
Cordia ramirezii Estrada
Cordia restingae M.Stapf
Cordia rickseckeri Millsp.
Cordia ripicola I.M.Johnst.
Cordia rogersii Hutch.
Cordia rufescens A.DC.
Cordia saccellia Gottschling & J.S.Mill.
Cordia sagotii I.M.Johnst.
Cordia salvadorensis Standl.
Cordia santacruzensis J.S.Mill. & M.Nee
Cordia scabra Desf.
Cordia scabrifolia A.DC.
Cordia schatziana J.S.Mill.
Cordia schottiana Fresen.
Cordia sebestena L.
Cordia seleriana Fernald
Cordia sellowiana Cham.
Cordia senegalensis Juss. ex Poir.
Cordia sericicalyx A.DC.
Cordia serratifolia Kunth
Cordia silvestris Fresen.
Cordia sinensis Lam.
Cordia sipapoi Gaviria
Cordia skutchii I.M.Johnst.
Cordia somaliensis Baker
Cordia sonorae Rose
Cordia splendida Diels
Cordia sprucei Mez
Cordia stellifera I.M.Johnst.
Cordia stenoclada I.M.Johnst.
Cordia stenoloba Gürke
Cordia stuhlmannii Gürke
Cordia subcordata Lam.
Cordia subdentata Miq.
Cordia suckertii Chiov.
Cordia sulcata A.DC.
Cordia superba Cham.
Cordia tacarcunensis J.S.Mill.
Cordia taguahyensis Vell.
Cordia tarodae M.Stapf
Cordia tetrandra Aubl.
Cordia thaisiana G.Agostini
Cordia tinifolia Willd. ex Roem. & Schult.
Cordia toqueve Aubl.
Cordia torrei E.S.Martins
Cordia tortuensis Urb. & Ekman
Cordia trachyphylla Mart.
Cordia triangularis Urb.
Cordia trichoclada A.DC.
Cordia trichocladophylla Verdc.
Cordia trichostemon A.DC.
Cordia trichotoma (Vell.) Arráb. ex Steud.
Cordia troyana Urb.
Cordia truncatifolia Bartlett
Cordia ucayaliensis (I.M.Johnst.) I.M.Johnst.
Cordia ulei I.M.Johnst.
Cordia umbellifera Killip ex G.Agostini
Cordia uncinulata De Wild.
Cordia valenzuelana A.Rich.
Cordia vanhermannii Alain
Cordia vargasii I.M.Johnst.
Cordia varroniifolia I.M.Johnst.
Cordia venosa Hemsl.
Cordia vestita (A.DC.) Hook.f. & Thomson
Cordia vignei Hutch. & Dalziel
Cordia watsonii N.E.Rose
Cordia weddellii I.M.Johnst.
Cordia williamsii G.Agostini ex Gaviria
Cordia yombomba Vaupel

Some species have been transferred to or retained in the genus Varronia, including:
Cordia curassavica (Jacq.) Roem. & Schult. = Varronia curassavica Jacq.
Cordia leucophlyctis Hook.f. = Varronia leucophlyctis (Hook.f.)
Cordia polycephala (Lam.) I.M.Johnst. = Varronia polycephala Lam.
Cordia rupicol Urb. = Varronia rupicola (Urb.) Britton

References

Cordia